Master is an American death metal band led by Paul Speckmann. Originally formed in Chicago, the band later relocated to Uherské Hradiště, Czechia.

History
The group was originally formed by Speckmann in 1983 as Death Strike, after the demise of his earlier band, Warcry. In 1985, Speckmann renamed the band Master and obtained a record deal with Combat Records. An album was recorded but was shelved due to issues with the label. The recording sessions for the album were released in 2003 by Displeased Records as Unreleased 1985 Album. In 1990, the band signed with the German label Nuclear Blast, which also had Speckmann's other group, Abomination, under contract. Master released their debut album, titled Master, in 1990. It was recorded with Chris Mittelbrun on guitars and Bill Schmidt on drums. Nuclear Blast did not approve of the album, however, and it was later re-recorded with Aaron Nickeas on drums and Jim Martinelli on guitars and released as Speckmann Project in 1991.

Master published On the Seventh Day God Created... Master in 1992, which featured Paul Masvidal on lead guitar. Collection of Souls was released in  1993, but Master did not re-sign with Nuclear Blast. The band went on hiatus, in search of a new record label. They released Faith Is in Season in 1998, through Pavement Music. Speckmann focused on several other projects, including the resurrected Abomination. In 1999, he joined Czech death metal band Krabathor and subsequently relocated to Czechia.

Master released Let's Start a War in 2002 on System Shock and followed with Spirit of the West in 2004. They then signed with German label Twilight Vertrieb and issued Four More Years of Terror in 2005. Five albums have been released since: Slaves to Society (2007), The Human Machine (2010), The New Elite (2012), The Witch Hunt (2013), An Epiphany of Hate (2016), and Vindictive Miscreant (2018).

Band members
Current
 Paul Speckmann – bass, vocals
 Aleš "Alex 93" Nejezchleba – guitars
 Peter Bajči – drums

Past
 Chris Mittelbrun – guitars
 Bill Schmidt – drums
 Aaron Nickeas – drums
 Jim Martinelli – guitars
 Zdeněk "Zdenál" Pradlovský – drums

Discography

Studio albums
 Master (1990)
 On the Seventh Day God Created... Master (1992)
 Collection of Souls (1993)
 Faith Is in Season (1998)
 Let's Start a War (2002)
 Unreleased 1985 Album (2003)
 The Spirit of the West (2004)
 Four More Years of Terror (2005)
 Slaves to Society (2007)
 The Human Machine (2010)
 The New Elite (2012)
 The Witch Hunt (2013)
 An Epiphany of Hate (2016)
 Vindictive Miscreant (2018)

Live albums
 Live in Mexico City (2000)
 Live Assault (DVD – 2013)
 Mangled Dehumanization (2012)
 Live (2018)
 God of Thunder (2019)
 Alive in Athens (2020)

EPs
 Follow Your Savior (2001)
 Widower (2019)

Compilations
 Masterpieces (2005)
 Command Your Fate (The Demo Collection) (2017)
 Best of (2018)

Splits
 Master / Abomination with Abomination (1990)
 Master / Excision with Excision (1996)
 Imperial Anthems with Pentagram Chile (2013)
 Decay into Inferior Conditions with Dehuman (2013)

Demos
 85 Demo (1985)
 Demo '91 (1991)
 Final Word (1995)
 Everything Is Rotten (2005)

References

External links
 Master/Paul Speckmann official website
 Paul Speckmann alternate website

Musical groups from Chicago
American death metal musical groups
Heavy metal musical groups from Illinois
Musical groups established in 1983
Nuclear Blast artists